Gabrijela Bartulović (née Bešen; born 6 December 1994) is a Croatian handball player for Dunaújvárosi Kohász KA and the Croatian national team.

She participated at the 2016 European Women's Handball Championship.

Her younger sister Lucija Bešen is also a handball player.

References

External links 
 

1994 births
Living people
Croatian female handball players
Handball players from Zagreb
21st-century Croatian women